The 2015–16 W-League season was the eighth season of the W-League, the Australian national women's association football competition. On 13 May 2015, it was confirmed that Melbourne City would join the league for the 2015–16 season.

League newcomers Melbourne City claimed both the regular season Premiership and end of season Championship, the latter awarded for their victory in the 2016 W-League grand final.

Clubs

Stadia and locations

Personnel and kits

Foreign players
 
The following do not fill a Visa position:
A Australian citizens who have chosen to represent another national team;
G Guest Players

Regular season

The W-League 2015–16 fixture was released on 8 September 2015. The regular season commenced on 17 October 2015, and concluded on 17 January 2016.

League table

Home and away season
In the 2015–16 season each team played 12 games with 2 bye rounds, kicking off on 17 October 2015, and concluding on 17 January 2016.

Round 1

Round 2

Round 3

Round 4

Round 5

Round 6

Round 7

Round 8

Round 9

Round 10

Round 11

Round 12

Round 13

Round 14

Finals series

Semi-finals

Grand final

Season statistics

Top scorers
Final at end of regular season 17 January 2016

Own goals

End-of-season awards
The following end of the season awards were announced at the 2015–16 Dolan Warren Awards night held at the Carriageworks in Sydney on 26 April 2016.
 Julie Dolan Medal – Ashleigh Sykes (Canberra United)
 Players’ Player of the Year – Kim Little (Melbourne City)
 Young Player of the Year – Larissa Crummer (Melbourne City)
 Golden Boot Award – Larissa Crummer (Melbourne City) (11 goals)
 Goalkeeper of the Year – Kaitlyn Savage (Adelaide United)
 Coach of the Year – Craig Deans (Newcastle Jets)
 Fair Play Award – Melbourne City
 Referee of the Year – Kate Jacewicz
 Goal of the Year – Vanessa DiBernardo (Brisbane Roar v Perth Glory, 15 November 2015)

See also

 2015–16 Adelaide United W-League season 
 2015–16 Brisbane Roar W-League season 
 2015–16 Melbourne City W-League season
 2015–16 Perth Glory W-League season

References

 
Australia
2015–16 in Australian women's soccer
A-League Women seasons